Tiscali Italia S.p.A. is an Italian telecommunications company wholly owned by Tiscali S.p.A.

Founded in 1999 and based in Cagliari, Sardinia, it deals with the Internet and telecommunications services offered in Italy by the Tiscali Group.

Since 2022, following the Tiscali-Linkem merger, the company has acquired full control of the retail services previously provided by Linkem S.p.A., including the brand.

Services 
Tiscali offers on the Italian market fixed telephony in XDSL, wideband and ultra-wideband access in FTTX and FWA, and mobile telephony through Tiscali Mobile (Mobile Virtual Network Operator launched in 2009), exploiting the Telecom Italia fixed network and the mobile from TIM.

It also provides news services on Tiscali.it, email, hosting and domains, IPTV (through Tiscali TV), and other business services.

See also
 Tiscali
 Tiscali Mobile
 Tiscali TV

References

External links
 

Companies based in Cagliari
Telecommunications companies established in 1999
Internet service providers of Italy
Italian brands
Telecommunications companies of Italy